Mount Dennis may refer to:

 Mount Dennis, a neighbourhood in Toronto
 Mount Dennis station, a future transit terminal in the Mount Dennis neighbourhood
 Kodak Mount Dennis Campus, a former industrial park in the Mount Dennis neighbourhood
 Mount Dennis (Yoho), a mountain summit in British Columbia, Canada